Sardzhalar, also Saracalar, is an abandoned village in the Ararat Province of Armenia.

References 

Populated places in Ararat Province